Dutch Sheets (born William Dutch Sheets in 1954) is an American author and pastor. Sheets has written over 20 books.

Early life

Sheets was born in Ohio; his father was a Nazarene Evangelist and Pastor. Sheets and his father co-authored the book, The Gold That Washed Ashore in 2007. Sheets grew up in Middletown, Ohio. Sheets began his undergraduate studies at Miami University of Ohio before transferring to Christ for the Nations Institute in Dallas, Texas. He graduated with a degree in Biblical Studies in 1978.

Career
In 1979, Sheets became the Worship Leader and Student Ministry Director at Christ for the Nations Institute where he was a student. In 1983, Sheets began teaching at The Living Word Bible College in Middletown, Ohio, which he did until 1986. He was an adjunct Professor at Christian Life School of Theology in Dallas, Texas from 1986 until 1999, as well as Christ for the Nations Institute, his alma mater.

In 1991, Sheets founded Freedom Church in Colorado Springs, Colorado. He was the Lead Pastor until 2010, when he stepped down from his role to dedicate more time to writing and speaking. In 1995, Sheets was awarded an honorary Doctor of Divinity by Christian Life School of Theology in Columbus, Georgia. In 1997, Sheets founded Dutch Sheets Ministries, where he is the acting CEO/President. Sheets is known for his apostolic and prophetic teaching style. In 2012, Sheets returned to Christ For the Nations Institute as the Executive Director, where he served for two years. 

Sheets was bestowed a Kentucky Colonel by Commonwealth of Kentucky twice. He was first presented with the title by Governor Ernie Fletcher in April 2004 and later by Governor Steven Beshear in February 2011. Arkansas Governor Asa Hutchinson appointed Sheets as Arkansas Traveler in February 2021. 

Sheets published his first book, Intercessory Prayer, in 1996. Intercession or intercessory prayer is the act of praying on behalf of oneself or others. Sheets has authored 23 books (including 3 as co-author), mostly focused on prayer and biblical teaching.

In 2015, Sheets released a daily prayer app called GiveHim15 where he encourages Christians around the globe to unite in prayer for 15 minutes each day.

Personal life
Sheets married his wife Ceci in 1977. Together they have two children. Ceci is the acting COO of Dutch Sheets Ministries.

Controversy
In 2015, Sheets' app GiveHim15 was released. Following the 2020 presidential election, Sheets used the app as a real-time tool to discuss prayers related to election fraud. Sheets states that he is not registered with any major political party.

Bibliography
 An Appeal To Heaven (Dutch Sheets Ministries, 2015) 
 Authority In Prayer: Praying With Power and Purpose (Bethany House Publishers, 2006) 
 Becoming Who You Are: Embracing the Power Of Your Identity In Christ (Bethany House Publishers, 2007, 2010) 
 Dream: Discovering God’s Purpose For Your Life (Bethany House Publishers, 2012) ISBN 978-0-7642-1021-1
 The Essential Guide To Prayer: How To Pray With Power and Effectiveness (Bethany House Publishers, 2001) 
 Getting in God’s Face (Gospel Light Publications, 2006) 
 Giants Will Fall (Dutch Sheets Ministries, 2018) 
 God’s Timing For Your Life (Bethany House Publishers, 2001) 
 History Makers (co-author) (Bethany House Publishers, 2004) 
 How To Pray For Lost Loved Ones (Bethany House Publishers, 2001) 
 Intercessory Prayer: How God Can Use Your Prayers To Move Heaven and Earth (Bethany House Publishers, 1996) 
 Intercessory Prayer: How God Can Use Your Prayers To Move Heaven and Earth - Study Guide (Bethany House Publishers, 1996) 
 The Gold That Washed Ashore (co-author) (Scribe Book Company, 2007) 
 The Pioneer Spirit (Independent Publisher, 2010) 
 The Pleasure Of His Company: A Journey To Intimate Friendship With God (Bethany House Publishers, 2014) 
 The Power Of Hope (Charisma House, 2014) 
 Praying for America (Gospel Light Publications, 2001) 
 Praying Through Sorrows (co-author) (Destiny Image Publishing, 2005) 
 Releasing the Prophetic Destiny Of a Nation (co-author) (Destiny Image Publishers, 2005) 
 The River of God (Gospel Light Publications, 1998) 
 Second in Command (co-author) (Destiny Image Publishing, 2005) 
 Watchman Prayer: Protecting Your Family, Home, and Community From the Enemy’s Schemes (Chosen Books, 2000, 2008) 
 The Way Back (Dutch Sheets Ministries, 2010, 2016, 2017)

References 
https://www.rollingstone.com/politics/politics-news/new-apostolic-reformation-mtg-mastriano-dutch-sheets-1234584952/amp/

External links
 

1954 births
20th-century American male writers
21st-century American male writers
Living people
American evangelists
American television evangelists
American Christian writers
American male non-fiction writers
American self-help writers